is a retired Japanese volleyball player.

She was part of the Japan women's national volleyball team at the 1994 FIVB Volleyball Women's World Championship in Brazil. On club level she played with Hitachi.

Clubs
 Hitachi (1994)

References

1970 births
Living people
Japanese women's volleyball players
Place of birth missing (living people)
Asian Games medalists in volleyball
Volleyball players at the 1994 Asian Games
Medalists at the 1994 Asian Games
Asian Games bronze medalists for Japan
Goodwill Games medalists in volleyball
Competitors at the 1994 Goodwill Games